Eths  (variably stylized as eths and ETHS) is a French extreme metal band from Marseille.

History 
Eths formed in 1996 under the name What's the fuck, with a lineup consisting of vocalist–guitarist Stéphane Bihl and guitarist Grégory Rouvière. The following year, Candice Clot, the best friend of Bihl's ex-girlfriend, joined the group as a lead vocalist, and the band was renamed Melting Point.

Through 1999, drummer Guillaume Dupré and bassist Marc Burghoffer were added to the lineup, and together they formed Eths. That same year they released a first demo titled Eths, containing "Encore" and "Rien à Dire". The band also appeared on a CD compilation titled Attentat Sonore.

In 2000, Eths released a seven-track EP titled Autopsie.

On 14 November 2001, Eths was the opening act for Machine Head at L'Usine in Istres. The band featured on two CD compilations, Boukan and A Core Et à Cri.

In March 2002, Eths made a television appearance at Rock Press Club's Canal Jimmy, performing "Samantha" and "Dévore". In September 2002, the band released a second EP titled Samantha and gained acclaim in the French extreme metal circuit.

On 11 October 2004, Eths released its first full-length album, Soma, and launched a 120-date national concert tour. That year, Clot, aged twenty three, who sang exclusively in her native language, said that she wrote "about things that scare me, that disgust me, about what I have inside of me".

In 2006, the group announced the departure of both Dupré and Burghoffer. As a result, the drumming on Eths' 2007 album Tératologie was performed by Pierre Belleville, then the drummer for Lofofora. Dupré returned to the band in 2011. Through constant touring, Soma would go on to sell over 25,000 copies.

On 18 September 2012, frontwoman Candice Clot left the band. Virginie Goncalves of Kells and Nelly Wood replaced Clot as temporary touring vocalists.

In 2013, the group announced Rachel Aspe as their new lead vocalist. In the same month, an injury led Rouvière to depart the band.

On 30 November 2016, the band notified the public of their breakup via a Facebook post and announced their last concert in Angers on 3 December 2016.

The original lineup of Bihl, Clot, Rouvière, Dupré, and Burghoffer reunited to play two final concerts, which took place at Le Moulin in Marseille and Le Trianon in Paris, on 8 April 2017, and 30 April 2017, respectively. The two concerts were also a posthumous homage to the band's friends, Mika Bleu and Julien Isilion.

On 15 December 2022, the official Eths Facebook page was updated with the status "Eths 2023". Shortly after, the band was confirmed to perform at Hellfest in June 2023.

Members

Final line-up 
 Stéphane "Staif" Bihl — guitar, sampling, vocals (1999–2016, 2017)
 Grégory "Greg" Rouvière — guitar (1999–2013, 2017)
 Candice Clot — lead vocals (1999–2012, 2017)
 Guillaume "Yom" Dupré — drums (1999–2006, 2011–2015, 2017)
 Marc "Roswell" Burghoffer — bass (1999–2006, 2017)

Former members 
 Damien Rivoal — bass (2011–2016)
 Rachel Aspe — lead vocals (2013–2016)

Touring members 
 Geoffrey "Shob" Neau — bass (2007–2011)
 Matthieu "Mat" LeChevalier — drums (2007–2008)
 Morgan Berthet — drums (2008–2011)
 Virginie Goncalves — clean vocals (2012–2013)
 Nelly Wood — unclean vocals (2012–2013)
 R.U.L. — drums (2013–2016)

Session musicians 
 Dirk Verbeuren — drums (Ankaa)
 Pierre Belleville — drums (Tératologie)
 Daniel "Dan" Ballin — bass (Tératologie)
 Fabrice "Donat" Ferrer — bass (Tératologie)

Timeline

Discography 
 Studio albums

 EPs & Demos
As Melting Point

As Eths

 Reissues

References 
 Interview with Candice and Staif in Marseille (February, 20th 2009)

Alternative metal musical groups
French groove metal musical groups
French nu metal musical groups
Musical groups from Marseille
Season of Mist artists